Margalla Express is a passenger train operated daily by Pakistan Railways between Lahore and Rawalpindi. The train named after the Margalla Hills in Islamabad

Route
 Lahore Junction–Rawalpindi via Karachi–Peshawar Railway Line

Station stops
 Lahore Junction
 Gujranwala
 Wazirabad Junction
 Gujrat
 Chaklala
 Rawalpindi

Equipment
The train offers AC Parlor, AC Business, AC Standard and Economy class.

References 

Named passenger trains of Pakistan
Passenger trains in Pakistan